The 1906 Alabama gubernatorial election took place on November 6, 1906, in order to elect the governor of Alabama. Democratic incumbent William D. Jelks was term-limited, and could not seek a second consecutive term.

Results

References

1906
gubernatorial
Alabama
November 1906 events